Te Aroha  was a parliamentary electorate in the Waikato region of New Zealand from 1890 to 1893. The electorate was represented by two Members of Parliament. The current Te Aroha ward is represented by the Matamata-Piako District in the Waikato region of New Zealand.

Population centres
In December 1887, the House of Representatives voted to reduce its membership from general electorates from 91 to 70. The 1890 electoral redistribution used the same 1886 census data used for the 1887 electoral redistribution. In addition, three-member electorates were introduced in the four main centres. This resulted in a major restructuring of electorates, and Te Aroha was one of four electorates to be first created for the 1890 election.

The electorate was based on the town of Te Aroha. In the 1890 elections, there were 22 polling booths in the electorate covering a large part of the eastern Waikato and the Coromandel.

History
The electorate was first formed for the 11th New Zealand Parliament in 1890. Votes for Allen and Fraser were 786 and 609 respectively; a majority of 177 votes for Allen, who was declared elected. After a petition by Fraser was accepted, the election was declared void on 3 April 1891.

The 9 July  was contested by Fraser, Sir Walter Buller, and Dr Broome (Allen was prevented from standing). It was won by Fraser with a large majority. He represented the electorate until the end of the term of the 11th Parliament in 1893, when the electorate was abolished.

Members of Parliament
The electorate was represented by two Members of Parliament:

Key

Election results

1891 by-election

1890 election

Notes

References

Historical electorates of New Zealand
1890 establishments in New Zealand
1893 disestablishments in New Zealand
Te Aroha
Politics of Waikato